Tilman Joseph Fertitta (born 1957) is an American billionaire businessman and television personality.  He is the chairman, CEO, and owner of Landry's, Inc. He also owns the National Basketball Association (NBA)'s Houston Rockets. Fertitta is chairman of the board of regents of the University of Houston System.

As of September 2022, his net worth was estimated at $7.6 billion. He was placed at No. 260 on the Forbes Billionaires List. Forbes calls him the "World's Richest Restaurateur".

Fertitta became the star of Billion Dollar Buyer on CNBC. On September 5, 2017, Fertitta reached an agreement to buy the Houston Rockets for $2.2 billion.

Early life and education
Tilman Fertitta was born in Galveston, Texas in 1957. He is of Sicilian descent. His father, Vic, owned a seafood restaurant on Galveston Island, and after school, Tilman would peel shrimp in his father's restaurant.

Fertitta attended Texas Tech University and the University of Houston, studying business administration and hospitality management. His first entrepreneurial experience involved selling and promoting Shaklee vitamins.

Career
In the 1980s, Fertitta founded and ran a construction and development business, and developed his first major project, the Key Largo Hotel in Galveston.

Landry's, Inc.

Fertitta was a partner in the first Landry's Restaurant, Landry's Seafood, which opened its doors in the Houston suburb of Katy, Texas, in 1980. A year later, he helped open Willie G's Seafood & Steaks, a more upscale restaurant in Uptown Houston.

In 1986, Fertitta gained controlling interests of both locations, and in 1988, became sole owner of Landry's Restaurants. In 1993, he took Landry's, Inc. public and the company grew quickly, adding concept after concept.

In 1993, Landry's was valued at approximately $30 million.

In 2004, Fertitta was elected to the Texas Business Hall of Fame, becoming the second-youngest Texan to ever earn that distinction, behind only Michael Dell.

In 2010, Fertitta, who already owned the majority of Landry's, Inc. stock, purchased all outstanding shares, becoming sole owner again. By 2011, the company's value had skyrocketed to a value of more than $1.7 billion.

His portfolio includes: The Golden Nugget Hotel and Casinos; Morton's The Steakhouse; Rainforest Cafe; Bubba Gump Shrimp Co.; McCormick & Schmick's Seafood & Steaks; Saltgrass Steak House; Claim Jumper; Chart House; The Oceanaire; Mastro's Restaurants; Grotto Restaurants, The Boathouse Restaurants  and Vic & Anthony's Steakhouse.  In 2017 he acquired half of
EMM group, owner of the Catch Restaurants.

Hotels
Fertitta first built the Key Largo Hotel in Galveston, Texas to buy the rights to Landry's. After acquiring restaurants under the company, Fertitta started focusing more on the hospitality division of Landry's and acquired the San Luis Resort, Spa, & Conference Center in Galveston, Texas. He also partnered with the City of Galveston to build the conference center in 2004 inside the resort. Fertitta since acquired two additional hotels on the island, including the Holiday Inn On the Beach in 2003, and the Hilton Galveston Island Resort in 2004, which stands adjacent to his San Luis Resort. In 2015, Fertitta added the Villas at San Luis section of the hotel, which consists of ultra-luxury villas with direct access to both the beach and the hotel's pool. In  June 2022, he was recognized by the International Hospitality Institute on the Global 100 in Hospitality, on a list featuring the 100 Most Powerful People in Global Hospitality.

Casinos

Landry's first expanded to casinos in 2005 when it bought Golden Nugget Casinos, including locations in Las Vegas and Laughlin, Nevada. Since then, Landry's has opened casinos in Atlantic City, New Jersey; Biloxi, Mississippi; and Lake Charles, Louisiana. The Golden Nugget Atlantic City was previously called the Trump Marina. Fertitta purchased this casino from Trump Entertainment Resorts in 2011.

The Golden Nugget Lake Charles was bought after Fertitta found a license and resort land for sale from Pinnacle Entertainment, which owns the adjacent L'Auberge du Lac Resort. Fertitta stated he built the casino with the idea of having a casino in close proximity to his Houston hometown. After the first year proved the casino was successful, a new 300 room tower began construction on the property.

Entertainment
In addition to restaurants, hotels, and casinos, Landry's also owns amusement parks, aquariums, and the Kemah Boardwalk. Landry's, Inc. first acquired the Kemah Boardwalk in 1999. After acquiring the boardwalk, Fertitta added a few Landry's restaurants, and a few rides. In 2007, he added the Boardwalk Bullet which is a high speed wooden roller coaster. He also added the Boardwalk Fanta Sea, which is a luxury yacht cruise service where guests ride along the Galveston Bay.

The marina on the boardwalk is the largest concentration of boats and yachts in Greater Houston, as well as one of the largest in the nation. The boardwalk also includes an aquarium, which is under the same Landry's line of aquarium restaurants with locations in Houston, Denver, and Nashville. Travel + Leisure magazine named the Kemah boardwalk a top 10 American boardwalk.

In 2000, Landry's acquired the land on the 400 block of Bagby in Downtown Houston. The deal came from a proposal of the City of Houston to redevelop the fire station. After redeveloping the building, the aquarium added the shark tank and restaurant before opening in 2003.

Fertitta redeveloped the pleasure pier in Galveston, Texas, after the pier had closed after damages by Hurricane Ike. The pier reopened in 2012 as the Galveston Island Historic Pleasure Pier. The redeveloped pier includes an amusement park, Bubba Gump Shrimp Company restaurant, as well as shops.

Sports

Texans
During the process of building the Houston Texans as an NFL team, Fertitta was one of the original investors in creating the franchise. He was a partner of Texans owner Bob McNair until 2008 when he had to sell his interest in the franchise because he owns the Golden Nugget casino chain (a Landry's subsidiary) and NFL rules state any staff member of a team cannot be associated with gambling. Both Fertitta and McNair were disappointed, as Fertitta was part of the franchise since its establishment.

Astros
In 2003, Fertitta bought the naming rights to the Crawford Boxes seating section of Minute Maid Park, calling it "Landry's Crawford Boxes". The term has become a commercial moniker during radio and television broadcasts. A Landry's sign is placed above the section, along with many of the company's subsidiaries. Traditionally, when a fan catches a home run, they are awarded a gift certificate to one of Landry's restaurants. Landry's promoters often visit the section and give away items such as T-shirts.

Rockets

On September 4, 2017, he agreed to purchase the Rockets from Leslie Alexander, pending league approval, for an NBA record $2.2 billion. On October 6, 2017, Fertitta was approved by the NBA to own the Houston Rockets. Fertitta paid for the Rockets by selling $1.415 billion worth of bonds and was competing with Houston-native singer Beyonce Knowles to purchase the team. By buying the Houston Rockets he also became the owner of Clutch Gaming, a professional eSports organization focused on League of Legends.

NHL
After Fertitta bought the Rockets and Toyota Center in 2017, he expressed interest in an expansion team or relocating an NHL team to Houston, with both options most likely playing at Toyota Center. In 2018, he held preliminary talks with commissioner Gary Bettman to discuss ownership of a team. While he hasn't stated much about potential ownership in recent months, it is speculated he may be working on a deal to purchase the Arizona Coyotes, though this hasn't been confirmed or denied by him.

Investments
Fertitta partnered with Richard Handler and announced a special-purpose acquisition company called Landcadia, a portmanteau of Fertitta's Landry's and Handler's Leucadia. The company plans to raise as much as $300 million in initial public offering.

On May 16, 2018, Fertitta announced that Landcadia would acquire Waitr.

Politics 
On October 4, 2019, the Houston Rockets general manager Daryl Morey issued a tweet that supported the 2019–20 Hong Kong protests which drew criticism from Fertitta who said that while Morey was the best general manager in the NBA, the Rockets were not a political organization. Morey later deleted the tweet.

In April 2020, Governor Greg Abbott named Fertitta to the Strike Force to Open Texas – a group "tasked with finding safe and effective ways to slowly reopen the state" during the COVID-19 pandemic.

Fertitta is known to support political leaders in both the Republican and Democratic parties. In particular, Fertitta has been a supporter of both Bill Clinton and the Bush family.

Mark Kelly, a Democrat and current United States Senator from Arizona, is considered to be a very close friend of Fertitta.

Media

Television

On January 12, 2016, it was announced that Fertitta would star in his own reality TV show titled Billion Dollar Buyer on CNBC. Billion Dollar Buyer premiered on March 22, 2016, at 10 P.M. Eastern Time. After receiving success during the first season, a second season was announced, featuring over twice as many episodes.

Books
On September 17, 2019, Fertitta released a book, Shut Up and Listen! Hard Business Truths That Will Help You Succeed, in which he details his journey to success and offers advice to other entrepreneurs on their business ventures. Each chapter contains "Tilmanism's" which focus on 6 important rules for any entrepreneur to follow: 
"(1) Be the Bull,
(2) No Spare Customers,
(3) Change, change, change,
(4) Know Your Numbers,
(5) Follow the 95/5 Rule, and
(6) Take No Out of Your Vocabulary"

Personal life
In 1991 Fertitta married Paige Farwell with whom he has four children, a daughter and three sons. Fertitta is now married to a Houston attorney, Lauren Ware.

He is third-cousin to former UFC owners Lorenzo and Frank Fertitta. An avid sports fan, Fertitta is a vocal supporter of the University of Houston Cougars and can be seen at most Cougar football and basketball games as well as court side for Houston Rockets basketball games. In 2016, Fertitta donated $20 million to rebuild the University of Houston's basketball home of Hofheinz Pavilion, since renamed Fertitta Center, along with donations for the construction of TDECU Stadium.

Fertitta is a close friend of retired NASA astronaut and Arizona senator Mark Kelly, and his wife, former Arizona congresswoman Gabby Giffords.

Fertitta is chairman of the board of the Houston Children's Charity. In 2009, Texas Governor Rick Perry appointed Fertitta to the board of regents of the University of Houston System. In 2008, Fertitta was named chairperson of the Houston Police Department's Police Foundation, supplying gear and equipment for Houston Police Officers. He is on the executive committee for the Houston Livestock Show and Rodeo. He is a board member of the Texas Heart Institute, the Museum of Fine Arts, Houston, and the Greater Houston Partnership.

In May 2022, The University of Houston College of Medicine received a $50 million pledge from Fertitta, the school was renamed the Tilman J. Fertitta Family College of Medicine.

References

External links

 Landrys official website

Living people
American billionaires
American chief executives of food industry companies
American philanthropists
American people of Italian descent
Businesspeople from Texas
Houston Rockets owners
National Basketball Association owners
Texas Tech University alumni
University of Houston alumni
University of Houston System regents
1957 births
Houston Texans owners